HMS Olympus was an  that served in the Royal Navy, and later in the Canadian Forces as a submarine trainer.

Design and construction

The Oberon class was a direct follow on of the Porpoise class, with the same dimensions and external design, but updates to equipment and internal fittings, and a higher grade of steel used for fabrication of the pressure hull. and constructed from a better grade of steel.

Displacement was  standard,  full load when surfaced, and  full load when submerged. Eight  diameter torpedo tubes were fitted (six facing forward, two aft), with a total payload of 24 torpedoes. The boats were fitted with Type 186 and Type 187 sonars, and an I-band surface search radar. The standard complement was 68: 6 officers, 62 sailors.

Construction and career
Olympus was laid down by Vickers-Armstrongs on 4 March 1960, and launched on 14 June 1961. The boat was commissioned into the Royal Navy on 7 July 1962. In September 1967 Olympus was among the vessels sent in search of a downed French Navy Breguet Atlantic which had been operating out of RAF Kinloss.

In April 1982, Olympus departed HMNB Devonport. It was believed at the time that she was deployed to the South Atlantic during the Falklands War.  In fact, for the duration of the Falklands Conflict Olympus took in NATO exercises off the coast of Scotland.

Olympus completed a two year refit at Devonport in July 1982, being fitted with a new Aluminum Fin and a 5-man swim-out chamber to aid submerged exit and entry of special forces swimmers. Following the refit, she joined the First Submarine Flotilla based at Gosport. In 1986, Olympus appeared in the popular UK Channel 4 television game show Treasure Hunt.  After rendezvousing with the submarine a few miles out of Plymouth Sound, presenter Anneka Rice watched on from the show's helicopter as Olympus surfaced, before landing on her hull and receiving the episode's second clue from the vessel's captain, Lt. Cmdr. John Tuckett.

Retired from the Royal Navy, Olympus was sold to the Canadian Forces in 1989 and was stationed as a non-operational training boat in Halifax, Nova Scotia. The ship was never commissioned into Canadian service and was turned over to Crown Assets for disposal on 27 April 2000.

In May 2005, the Halifax Chronicle-Herald announced that Maritime Command (MARCOM) was looking to sell Olympus and three other Canadian Oberons for scrap metal. MARCOM stated that the submarines were not in suitable condition to be used as museum ships (despite an appeal launched in 2002 to return her for display to her Barrow-in-Furness birthplace), and predicted that each submarine would sell for between C$50,000 and C$60,000.

In July 2011, Olympus started making her journey from Halifax to a scrapyard (International Marine Salvage) in Port Maitland, Ontario. The submarine arrived on 28 July for scrapping.

References

Publications

External links
 Submarine Heritage Centre

 

Oberon-class submarines of the Royal Navy
Ships built in Barrow-in-Furness
1961 ships
Cold War submarines of the United Kingdom
Oberon-class submarines of Canada
Auxiliary ships of the Royal Canadian Navy